Miss Fortune is an American post-hardcore band from Oklahoma City, Oklahoma.  The band has released three albums, all of which have reached the Billboard charts.

History 

Miss Fortune was formed in February 2012 by vocalist Mikey Sawyer and Eddie Cano (formerly of the Rise Records band Scarlett O'Hara), then guitarists Josh Kikta, Harley Graves, Ian Marchionda on Bass, and Jace Thomas on Drums. On May 28, 2012, they self-released their debut single, produced by Joey Sturgis featuring Tyler Carter of the band Issues.

By December 2013, the band announced signing with Sumerian Records after removing Eddie Cano from their lineup as the unclean vocalist.

In early 2014, the band released their first single on the label called "Interstate 44", which would be from their upcoming full-length album, "A Spark To Believe". Shortly after, a music video for the song "Chasing Dreams" was released March 5, 2014. On May 13th, the band released their "No Light, No Light, a cover of Florence + The Machine as part of the Sumerian Records cover compilation "Florence + The Sphinx: Sumerian Ceremonials"

In May 2014, Miss Fortune announced they would be embarking on tour with I See Stars, Like Moths to Flames, Ghost Town, and Razihel.

In March 2014, the band announced they would be touring with Hands Like Houses, Slaves, and Alive Like Me.

On May 19, 2014, the band released their debut full-length 'A Spark To Believe' produced by Kris Crummett.

Despite the success of the album, it was announced on October 30, 2014, that Miss Fortune had been dropped by Sumerian Records following lead singer Mikey Sawyer's arrest on domestic assault charges in Tulsa, Oklahoma
Sawyer published a statement on November 14 providing court records showing the singer was exonerated on all charges and would remain as the lead vocalist of the band moving forward. The band was not invited back onto the label.

In November 2016, the band released a stand-alone single called Die for You which would feature Luke Holland on drums, produced by Cameron Mizell.

In April 2017, the band released a music video, which has since been deleted, of their single 'The Bottom' produced by Cameron Mizell. The same month, Michael Skaggs and Nick Taylor departed the band for personal reasons.

In March 2018, Mikey Sawyer announced the band had signed to We Are Triumphant for their LP mixtape "How The Story Ends", which came along with singles "The Hype You Stole", "3rd Degree", and "Hit the Road", before releasing the full studio album July 27, 2018.

Also, sometime in 2018, the group released a track called "When The Lights Go Out", but the track got deleted on all platforms and is no longer available.

In January 2019, the band released their cover of Post Malone's "Sunflower" as part of the We Are Triumphant cover album, Got You Covered, Vol. 3.

In July 2019, Miss Fortune announced they were recording their self-titled LP with producer Andrew Wade. The first single 'Hearts on Fire' surfaced on December 5, 2019. Sawyer announced that he had an enlisted a new group to record the album including Hoi Wai Raphael Lam on guitar, Rufus Mann on bass, and Christopher Alemndarez on drums. 'Fentanyl' was released with an animated music video on January 24, 2020, announcing their new album 'Miss Fortune' would be released April 3. The final single 'Laugh at My Lessons' from the self-titled album was released March 13, 2020.

On June 26, 2020, they released a cover of The Offspring's song "The Kids Aren't Alright" as part of their acoustic full-length "Cruel Summer", announcing the band had signed to We Are Triumphant for a one off acoustic EP.

On February 5, 2021, Miss Fortune published a song called "The Day The Sun Died" as a teaser to an upcoming album coming later in the 2021 year.

Members 
Current
 Mikey Sawyer - vocals (2012–present)

Former
 Eddie Cano - unclean vocals (2012)
 Josh Kikta - lead guitar (2012-2018)
 Harley Graves - guitar (2012–2014)
 Ian Marchionda - bass (2012–2014)
 Nick Taylor - drums (2016–2017)
 Michael Skaggs - bass (2016-2017)
 Jace Thomas - drums (2012-2014)
 Raphael Lam - guitar (2019-2020)
 Rufus Mann - bass (2019-2020)
 Christopher Almendarez - drums (2018-2020)

Discography

Albums 
 A Spark To Believe (2014)  [#13 Heatseekers, #20 Hard Rock albums, #155 Independent albums
 How the Story Ends (2018)
 Miss Fortune (2020) [#11 Heatseekers, #20 Hard Rock albums, #30 Independent albums
 Gravity's Rainbow (2023)

Singles
 "The Double Threat of Danger (feat. Tyler Carter)"(2012)
 "Interstate 44"(2014)
 "Chasing Dreams" (2014)
 "No Light, No Light" (2014)
 "Die for You (feat. Luke Holland" (2016)
 "The Bottom" (2017)
 "The Hype You Stole" (2018)
 "3rd Degree" (2018)
 "Hit the Road" (2018)
 "When The Lights Go Out" (2018) (no longer available)
 "Sunflower" (2019)
 "Hearts on Fire" (2019)
 "Fentanyl" (2019)
 "Laugh at My Lessons" (2020)
 "Your Reminder" (2020)
 "The Day The Sun Died" (2021) 
 “All The White Lies in The World” (2021)
 “Backlash” (2022)
 “Rolling Blackout” (2022)
 "Matching Energies" (2023)

Other Appearances 
 Florence + The Sphinx: Sumerian Ceremonials (2014) - "No Light, No Light" (Originally performed by Florence + The Machine)
 Got You Covered, Vol 3 (2019) - "Sunflower" (Originally performed by Post Malone featuring Swae Lee)
 The Kids Aren't Alright (2020) - "The Kids Aren't Alright" (Originally performed by The Offspring)

References

American post-hardcore musical groups
Heavy metal musical groups from Oklahoma
2012 establishments in Oklahoma